Nicolas Mahut and Édouard Roger-Vasselin were the defending champions; however, Roger-Vasselin chose not to compete this year.
As a result, Mahut played alongside Julien Benneteau. They reached the final, where they lost to Jamie Delgado and Jonathan Marray.

Seeds

Draw

Draw

External Links
 Main Draw

BNP Paribas Primrose Bordeaux - Doubles
2011 Doubles